Josef Peters may refer to:
Josef Peters (racing driver) (1914–2001), German Formula One driver
Josef John W. Peters, a former member of I Killed the Prom Queen, an Australian metalcore band

See also
Joseph Peters, one of the aliases of J. Peters (1894–1990), Communist political activist and espionage agent in the United States from 1924 to 1949